"Oxygen" is the third single by the Swedish pop music singer Marie Serneholt, released from her first album Enjoy the Ride in 2006.

After so much speculation about Marie's third single, promotional copies of the song were sent to Swedish radios in the second week of October. The video was premiered on 26 October on Swedish Music Channels. The song had already been released for digital download on 9 October. No physical release was made for this single. The song peaked at number seventy-six, failing to chart inside the Top 60.

Music video
The video was filmed in Stockholm, Sweden, on 22 September and it was premiered on 26 October.

Serneholt posted on her official blog: "Yay!! My new video is done and i'm so happy and proud over it! Can't wait for you to see it! I'm so excited! I wrote this in the Swedish forum, but i just want to thank all of you who's supporting me and my music, this Monday i received my first prize here in Sweden:-) it is called Guldmobilen, and you get that prize when your song's been downloaded more than 10000 times from 3s portal. So THANK YOU!!!:-) A big hug to all of you! //Your Marie"

As the video starts, Serneholt appears to be naked, singing the song on her bed. She puts her dress on, goes out of her house and starts to fly. The video also shows Serneholt walking on the road and flying above the sea and singing on the beach. The video was filmed on location and uses special effects.

Track listing
Digital download
"Oxygen" Radio version/ album version – 4:23

Charts

References

2006 singles
Marie Serneholt songs
Songs written by Jörgen Elofsson